The yellow bittern (Ixobrychus sinensis) is a small bittern. It is of Old World origins, breeding in the northern Indian Subcontinent, east to the Russian Far East, Japan and Indonesia. It is mainly resident, but some northern birds migrate short distances. It has been recorded as a vagrant in Alaska and there is a single sighting in Great Britain, from Radipole Lake, Dorset on November 23, 1962 – however, the British Ornithologists' Union has always considered this occurrence to be of uncertain provenance and currently it is not accepted onto the official British List.

Taxonomy
The yellow bittern was formally described in 1789 by the German naturalist Johann Friedrich Gmelin in his revised and expanded edition of Carl Linnaeus's Systema Naturae. He placed it with the herons, cranes, storks and bitterns in the genus Ardea and coined the binomial name Ardea sinensis. Gmelin based his description on the "Chinese heron" that had been included by the English ornithologist John Latham in his multi-volume work A General Synopsis of Birds. Latham based his description on a collection of Chinese drawings. The yellow bittern is now one of ten species placed in the genus Ixobrychus that was introduced in 1828 by the Swedish naturalist Gustaf Johan Billberg. The genus name combines the Ancient Greek ixias, a reed-like plant and brukhomai, to bellow. The specific epithet sinensis is Modern Latin meaning "China". The species is monotypic: no subspecies are recognised.

Description
The male is uniformly dull yellow above and buff below. The head and neck are chestnut, with a black crown. The female's crown, neck and breast are streaked brown, and the juvenile is like the female but heavily streaked brown below, and mottled with buff above. Yellow bitterns feed on insects, fish and amphibians.

Distribution and habitat

The yellow bittern's breeding habitat is reed beds. They nest on platforms of reeds in shrubs. Four to six eggs are laid. They can be difficult to see, given their skulking lifestyle and reed bed habitat, but tend to fly fairly frequently, when the striking contrast between the black flight feathers and the otherwise yellowish plumage makes them unmistakable.

Conservation
The yellow bittern is protected under the Migratory Bird Treaty Act of 1918.

References

Bitterns
Birds of East Asia
Birds of Southeast Asia
Birds of Pakistan
Ixobrychus
Birds described in 1789
Taxa named by Johann Friedrich Gmelin
Birds of Nepal